Udo Steymann v Staatssecretaris van Justitie  (1988) Case 196/87 is a European Union law case, concerning the free movement of workers in the European Union.

Facts
Udo Steymann was a German plumber working in the Netherlands. He joined the Bhagwan Community, a religious group who provided for each other's material needs through commercial activity including running a discothèque, a bar and a launderette. He participated in the community by doing plumbing, household duties and other activities. The community would provide for people irrespective of the activities they undertook. He applied for residence to pursue the activity but was refused. When he appealed a reference was made to the European Court of Justice (ECJ).

Judgment
The ECJ held that remuneration may be indirect “quid pro quo” rather than strict consideration for work i.e. work does not need to be paid for in money as long as the worker agrees to receive something else in return.

See also

European Union law

References

European Union labour case law